Holocausto de la Morte is the second full-length studio album by the American death metal band Necrophagia. It was released in 1998 on Red Stream Records. This is the only studio album to feature Anton Crowley, Wayne Fabra and Dustin Havnen, although they would all be featured on the next EP.

Track listing

Personnel
 Killjoy – vocals
 Anton Crowley – guitars
 Wayne Fabra – drums
 Dustin Havnen – bass guitar

External links
Metal Archives

Necrophagia albums
1998 albums